A penumbral lunar eclipse took place on Tuesday, July 17, 1962. This very subtle penumbral eclipse was essentially invisible to the naked eye; though it lasted 2 hours and 48 minutes, just 39% of the Moon's disc was in partial shadow (with no part of it in complete shadow).

Visibility

Related lunar eclipses

Lunar year series

Half-Saros cycle
A lunar eclipse will be preceded and followed by solar eclipses by 9 years and 5.5 days (a half saros). This lunar eclipse is related to two partial solar eclipses of Solar Saros 116.

See also
List of lunar eclipses
List of 20th-century lunar eclipses

Notes

External links

1962-07
1962 in science